The European Payment Order (EPO) is a system of cross-border debt-collecting methods established on December 11, 2006 that is used in the European Union.

Uses
The European Payment Order is only available for cross-border cases. It allows for citizens and businesses to use a simple method to enforce uncontested payments. Small businesses in particular should benefit from the EPO since it provides a simple, cost-effective method of collecting payments from a multinational group of customers.

Local law
Local debt-recovering systems work alongside the European Payment Order. Creditors can choose which system they wish to use. One of the biggest benefits of using the European Payment Order is that it is specifically designed to work in multinational scenarios.

See also
Debt collection

References

European Union law
2006 in law
2006 in the European Union
European Union regulations
Judicial cooperation in civil matters in the European Union